Turricula javana, common name the Java turrid, is a species of sea snail, a marine gastropod mollusk in the family Clavatulidae.

Description
The size of an adult shell varies between 35 mm and 70 mm. The whorls are angular and tuberculated in the middle. These tubercles develop from more or less indistinct oblique folds or ribs, everywhere closely encircled by striae. The color of the shell is light yellowish brown, the tubercles lighter.

Distribution
This marine species has a wide distribution going from East Africa and Pakistan to Queensland, Australia; off Vietnam and in the South China Sea.

References

 Linnaeus, C. 1767. Systema naturae, per regna tria naturae, secundum classes, ordines, genera, species, cum characteribus, differentiis, synonymis, locis. Holmiae [= Stockholm] : L. Salvii Vol. 1(2) 12, pp. 533–1327.
 Gmelin J.F. 1791. Caroli a Linné. Systema Naturae per regna tria naturae, secundum classes, ordines, genera, species, cum characteribus, differentiis, synonymis, locis. Lipsiae : Georg. Emanuel. Beer Vermes. Vol. 1(Part 6) pp. 3021–3910. 
 Perry, G. 1811. Conchology, or the natural history of shells containing a new arrangement of the genera and species, illustrated by coloured engravings, executed from the natural specimens and including the latest discoveries. London : W. Miller 4 pp., 62 pls.
 Lamarck, J.B.P.A. de M. 1822. Histoire naturelle des Animaux sans Vertèbres. Paris : J.B. Lamarck Vol. 7 711 pp.
 Hedley, C. 1922. A revision of the Australian Turridae. Records of the Australian Museum 13(6): 213–359, pls 42-56
 Powell, A.W.B. 1969. The family Turridae in the Indo-Pacific. Part. 2. The subfamily Turriculinae. Indo-Pacific Mollusca 2(10): 207-415, pls 188-324
 Hinton, A. 1972. Shells of New Guinea and the Central Indo-Pacific. Milton : Jacaranda Press xviii 94 pp. 
 Tucker, J.K. 2004. Catalog of recent and fossil turrids (Mollusca: Gastropoda). Zootaxa 682: 1-1295 
 Li, BQ. & Li, XZ. 2008. Report on the two subfamilies Clavatulinae and Cochlespirinae (Mollusca : Neogastropoda : Turridae) from the China seas. Zootaxa 1771: 31-42

External links
 

javana
Gastropods described in 1767
Taxa named by Carl Linnaeus